Jarrett Anthony Rivers (born 10 September 1993) is an English professional footballer who plays as a right winger for  club Darlington. He previously played in the Football League for Blackpool.

Career
Rivers played youth football for Middlesbrough; after he was released he began working in a factory but "quit after one day because it made me realise I did not want to do that for the rest of my life, so I have worked hard in football ever since." After spending the 2013–14 season with Whitley Bay, Rivers joined Blyth Spartans. He combined his non-league football career with a job in his mother's newsagents shop. After impressing in Blyth Spartans' FA Cup run, including scoring the winner in the second-round victory against Hartlepool United, he went on trial with Oldham Athletic in January 2015. He was named Northern Premier League Young Player of the Season for 2014–15, and in May 2015 he signed a one-year professional contract with an option for a second year with Blackpool, newly relegated to League One. He made 10 League One appearances for Blackpool, mainly as a substitute, but the option for a further year was not taken up and he rejoined Blyth Spartans in August 2016.

He signed for Darlington in May 2019.

Career statistics

References

1993 births
Living people
English footballers
Association football wingers
Middlesbrough F.C. players
Whitley Bay F.C. players
Blyth Spartans A.F.C. players
Blackpool F.C. players
Darlington F.C. players
Northern Premier League players
English Football League players
National League (English football) players